The China Railway K3/4 train is a weekly international K-series train from Beijing to Moscow via Ulaanbaatar mainly using the Trans-Siberian and Trans-Mongolian railways.

The train started running in 1959, covering a distance of 7826km, and is the 4th longest passenger train service in the world. The Beijing to Moscow train (K3/003/003З) departs every Wednesday from Beijing station and takes 131 hours and 31 minutes to arrive at Moscow Yaroslavsky station, while the Moscow to Beijing train (K4/004/004З) departs every Tuesday from Moscow and takes 129 hours and 50 minutes to arrive at Beijing.

History 
When this train was first operated in the 1960s, most of the passengers were government officials, with there being police guarding it even in the depot, earning it the nickname "The Mystery Train of the East". During the Sino-Soviet split in the 1980s, as little as 20 passengers took the K3/4 train, although it continued to operate.

In 2000, China initiated its third campaign to increase the speed of its railways, the K3/4 train was sped up and renumbered from 3/4 to K3/4. After the 2000s, the train became mostly used by tourists instead, becoming a tourist train.

Train composition
The train is mostly made up of China Railway train cars, . There is no air conditioning in the train, as it uses coal for heating, requiring on average 4-5 tons of coal for each staff member on the train.

As China uses 1435mm standard gauge rail track, while Russia and Mongolia use 1520 mm broad gauge track, there is a break of gauge at the Chinese-Mongolian border, where the train stops for around three hours at Erenhot, where passengers first go through Chinese immigration procedures, then the entire train is lifted up, then the train's bogies are swapped out for new bogies of the corresponding gauge. Passengers remain in the train while this procedure is conducted.

The train is composed of thirteen carriages in China, with nine international carriages, composed of five hard sleepers, three  soft sleepers and a baggage car, as well as three domestic hard sleeper carriages and a domestic restaurant car. Other domestic restaurant cars and sleeper carriages are also attached upon entering Mongolia and Russia.

Timetable 

 There is no time difference between China and Mongolia. The time difference between Moscow and China/Mongolia is 5 hours.
 Names in Russian and Mongolian are romanized according to Wikipedia:Romanization of Russian and Wikipedia:Naming conventions (Mongolian).

Pop culture
The 2018 Chinese crime film  and other, older films were based on the Trans-Siberian train robberies that happened on this train in the early 1990s.

The 2020 Chinese comedy film Lost in Russia portrays the protagonist and his mother taking the K3/4 train to Moscow.

Ticketing
The train is priced using Chinese yuan when sold in China, although ticket scalpers may resell the train tickets at much higher prices. 
Prices to major stations from Beijing:

Notes

References 

Trans-Siberian Railway
1959 establishments in China
China Railway passenger services